Buford Eugene Long (December 14, 1931 – September 1, 2006) was an American college and professional football player who was a defensive back, halfback and end in the National Football League (NFL) for three seasons during the 1950s.  Long played college football for the University of Florida, and thereafter, he played professionally for the New York Giants of the NFL.

Early years 

Long was born in Lake Wales, Florida in 1931. He attended Lake Wales High School, where he played high school football for the Lake Wales Highlanders.

College career 

Long attended the University of Florida in Gainesville, Florida, where he played for coach Bob Woodruff's Florida Gators football team from 1950 to 1952.  In an era when the college football rules permitted only limited player substitutions, Long played on both offense and defense, and was a standout halfback and defensive back.  Memorably, as a senior in 1952, Long ran seventy-seven yards for a touchdown in the Gators' 30–0 upset of their rivals, the Georgia Bulldogs.  Long was a key member of the Gators' 1952 backfield that included fullback Rick Casares and quarterback Doug Dickey and led the Gators to an 8–3 season and a 14–13 victory over the Tulsa Golden Hurricane—their first-ever NCAA-sanctioned post-season bowl game.  Memorably, as a senior, he had 77-yard touchdown run to help defeat the rival Georgia Bulldogs 30–0.  Bob Woodruff ranked Long as one of the three best backs to play for the Gators during the 1950s.

During his senior season, Long rushed for fourteen touchdowns, and was a third-team All-Southeastern Conference (SEC) selection.  He finished his college career with twenty-five rushing touchdowns, which still ranks eighth on the Gators' all-time career records list.  Long also earned varsity letters as a member of the Florida Gators baseball and track and field teams.

He graduated from Florida with a bachelor's degree in physical education in 1955, and was later inducted into the University of Florida Athletic Hall of Fame as a "Gator Great."

Professional career 

In his three-year NFL career, Long played in twenty-six games, rushed fifty-two times for 164 yards and a touchdown, had thirty-three receptions for 462 yards and four touchdowns, made three interceptions, and returned twenty-three kickoffs for 607 yards.

Long died September 1, 2006 at his home in Wauchula; he was 74 years old.

See also 

 Florida Gators football, 1950–59
 List of Florida Gators in the NFL Draft
 List of New York Giants players
 List of University of Florida alumni
 University of Florida Athletic Hall of Fame

References

Bibliography 

 Carlson, Norm, University of Florida Football Vault: The History of the Florida Gators, Whitman Publishing, LLC, Atlanta, Georgia (2007).  .
 Golenbock, Peter, Go Gators!  An Oral History of Florida's Pursuit of Gridiron Glory, Legends Publishing, LLC, St. Petersburg, Florida (2002).  .
 Hairston, Jack, Tales from the Gator Swamp: A Collection of the Greatest Gator Stories Ever Told, Sports Publishing, LLC, Champaign, Illinois (2002).  .
 McCarthy, Kevin M.,  Fightin' Gators: A History of University of Florida Football, Arcadia Publishing, Mount Pleasant, South Carolina (2000).  .
 McEwen, Tom, The Gators: A Story of Florida Football, The Strode Publishers, Huntsville, Alabama (1974).  .
 Nash, Noel, ed., The Gainesville Sun Presents The Greatest Moments in Florida Gators Football, Sports Publishing, Inc., Champaign, Illinois (1998).  .

1931 births
2006 deaths
People from Lake Wales, Florida
People from Wauchula, Florida
Players of American football from Florida
American football defensive backs
American football ends
American football halfbacks
Florida Gators football players
New York Giants players
Baseball players from Florida
Florida Gators baseball players
Track and field athletes from Florida
Track and field athletes in the National Football League
Florida Gators men's track and field athletes